Disfigured Narcissus is an album by the British death metal band Gutworm, released in 2007.

Track listing 

 Intro (Silence)
 My First Loving Enemy
 Disfigured Narcissus
 Omniscient Dreams
 Imperfect Harmony
 Fires That Burn
 Sentiment
 Unholy Tryst
 Scrape The Blood (Off The Face Of Life)
 Outro (The Deafening)

Gutworm albums
2007 albums